Mawson Bank is a submarine bank in the Ross Sea off Antarctica named for British Antarctic scientist Sir Douglas Mawson. The name was approved by the Advisory Committee for Undersea Features in June 1988.

References

Undersea banks of the Southern Ocean